Doron Egozi (born October 25, 1980) is an Israeli Olympic sport shooter.

Biography
Egozi is Jewish, and was born in Ma'abarot, Israel.  He is coached by Israeli Olympian Guy Starik.

In July 2007, Egozi came in eighth in the 50 metre rifle three positions at the European Championships in Spain. 

He competed on behalf of Israel at the 2008 Summer Olympics in Beijing, China, in the Men's 50 metre rifle three positions, in which he came in 36th, and in the Men's 10 metre air rifle, in which he came in 41st.

References

External links
 

1980 births
Living people
Israeli male sport shooters
Olympic shooters of Israel
Shooters at the 2008 Summer Olympics
Jewish sport shooters
Israeli Jews
People from Ma'abarot, Israel